Sliven Province (former name Sliven okrug) is a province in southeastern Bulgaria, named after its administrative and industrial centre—the city of Sliven. It embraces a territory of  that is divided into four municipalities, with a total population, as of December 2009, of 204,887.

Municipalities

The Sliven province contains four municipalities. The following table shows the names of each municipality in English and Cyrillic, the main town or village (towns are shown in bold), and the population of each as of December 2009.

Main city

Sliven is situated at the foot of the unique rock massif "Sinite Kamani" (The Blue Rocks), very close to mineral springs. The town is famous for its clean fresh air, clean water sources, mild winters and cool summers.

Sliven is the only Bulgarian town that has never changed its Slavonic name, though it is one of the oldest settlements in Europe. Thracians, Romans, Slavs, and Ancient Greeks have all lived in the region. The first Roman settlement on this place, Tuida (3rd century BC), was a famous trade centre. Sliven was mentioned as a big town for the first time in 1153 by the Arab traveler Muhammad al-Idrisi.

Demographics

The following table represents the change of the population in the province after World War II:

Ethnic groups

Total population (2011 census): 197 473
Ethnic groups (2011 census):
Identified themselves: 173 206 persons:
Bulgarians: 132 697 (76.61%)
Romani: 20 478 (11.82%)
Turks:  16 784 (9.69%) 
Others and indefinable: 3 247 (1.87%)

A further 24,000 persons in Sliven Province did not declare their ethnic group at the 2011 census.

According to the 2001 census, the province had a population of 218 474 inhabitants, of whom 163 188 were Bulgarians, 26 777 Romani, 22 971 Turks, etc.

Religion
Religious adherence in the province according to 2001 census:

Nature Park Sinite Kamani - The Blue Rocks

The Sinite Kamani Nature Park is famous for its nature landmarks. Halkata — the arc-shaped rock garland, possessing, according to the legends, magic force — is one of the symbols of the town of Sliven. The forms that the nature has sculptured in the cave Zmeevi dupki – Zmeyat, Orelat and Vladishkiyat tron are amazing.

The ancient beech forest in the vicinity of the Kushbunar spring in the region of Karandila is picturesque.

The specific climate and lay conditions of the nature park determine the great diversity of flora and fauna. The plant species are more than 1000, about 900 of which are representative of high species.

The invertebrate animals are represented by 235 species — eight species of fish, nine species of amphibians, nineteen species of reptiles, 165 species of birds and 34 species of mammals.

The lay is of typical mountain type — steep and ravine slopes and between 290 and 1181 meters above sea level. The north and northwest winds, called bora, famous as the wind of the town of Sliven and the night breeze are typical for the region. Through the park flow many rivers and their beds form numerous shoots, pools and waterfalls.

See also
Provinces of Bulgaria
List of villages in Sliven Province

References

External links
Photos of Sliven
Photo Reportages from Sliven

 
Provinces of Bulgaria